Claude Ryan,  (January 26, 1925 – February 9, 2004) was a Canadian journalist and politician. He was the director of the newspaper Le Devoir from 1964 to 1978, leader of the Quebec Liberal Party from 1978 to 1982, National Assembly of Quebec member for Argenteuil from 1979 to 1994 and Minister of Education from 1985 to 1989.

Early life
Ryan was born in Montreal, Quebec, the son of Blandine Dorion and Henri-Albert Ryan. Ryan's brother, Yves Ryan, was also politically active and served as mayor of Montreal North from 1963 to 2001.

Journalism
From 1962 to 1978, Ryan was editorialist at Le Devoir, a French-language daily newspaper in Montreal, and he was the director of the newspaper from 1964 to 1978.  During his tenure at the head of the editorial staff he became known for his probity and his mastery of contemporary political issues. His advice was sought by the provincial governments of Quebec and by opposition parties.

During the 1970 October Crisis Ryan was accused of participating in a plot to overthrow Robert Bourassa's recently elected government. Though the rumour was proven to be baseless, it served as a source of tension between Ryan and Prime Minister of Canada Pierre Elliott Trudeau, whom Ryan suspected of having spread the rumour in an attempt to damage him politically.

Politics
Bourassa lost the 1976 election and his own MNA seat to the Parti Québécois under René Lévesque, in part due to the editorial position of Le Devoir under Ryan's stewardship. Subsequently, Ryan won the 1978 Quebec Liberal Party leadership election and served as party leader from 1978 to 1982, where he opposed Lévesque in two prominent campaigns (a referendum and an election).

Ryan led the victorious "No" side in the 1980 Quebec referendum on sovereignty which captured 60% of the vote. One particular turning point in the campaign was when Quebec PQ cabinet minister Lise Payette criticized Ryan's wife, Madeleine, as an "Yvette," a stay-at-home character in a popular Quebec storybook, then further suggesting that all females who were against sovereignty were acting as "Yvettes". This attack outraged many women voters in Quebec, especially since Madeleine Ryan was very active in political and social circles.  Madeleine herself responded by organizing a brunch des Yvettes at the Château Frontenac on March 30.  A week later, 14,000 women gathered at the Montreal Forum to denounce Payette's remarks.  By nearly all accounts, many women voted "No" in the referendum out of anger at this insult.

Nonetheless, Pierre Trudeau was particularly critical of Ryan. Trudeau first criticized the performance of the Quebec Liberal Party, saying it was "drowning in a swamp of its own verbiage" during a televised National Assembly debate on sovereignty, in contrast to the Parti Québécois which had masterfully coordinated its speakers. Trudeau also said that Ryan's initial campaign efforts of talking to small groups of people was insufficient, which resulted in the federal cabinet minister Jean Chrétien being sent in to help the federalist side. That helped to perpetuate the strained relationship between Ryan and Trudeau.

Ryan then led the party into the 1981 provincial election. His Liberals finished just 3% behind the PQ in the popular vote, but the latter won twice as many seats; Quebec elections have typically seen large discrepancies between raw votes and seat counts. The loss was widely blamed on Ryan's campaign style, which was criticized for being old-fashioned and ill-suited for the television age. Notably, he refused to tailor sound bites for the evening news. Ryan was succeeded as MNA opposition leader and party chief by Bourassa, who was making a political comeback.

After the Liberals regained power under Bourassa in the 1985 election, Ryan became one of the most important members of the government and served as Minister of Education. He was also Minister of municipal affairs, public safety and minister responsible for the Charter of the French language. He also served in the cabinet led by Daniel Johnson.

Many in English Canada might remember Ryan for his work against the establishment of an independent Quebec. Those who followed his career, as a publisher and later as a politician, noted that he also opposed the existing federal status quo, which he considered as too centralized, despite statements to the contrary by Canadian Prime Minister Pierre Elliott Trudeau.

Retirement
Ryan retired from politics in September 1994. In 1995, he was made a Companion of the Order of Canada. In 2002, he was awarded the Canadian version of the Queen Elizabeth II Golden Jubilee Medal.

Ryan died in Montreal, on February 9, 2004, at 4:20 a.m, of stomach cancer. In 2006, he was posthumously made a Grand Officer of the National Order of Quebec.

Works
Besides his abundant editorial production in Le Devoir, Ryan also published:
Les classes moyennes au Canada français, 1950
L'éducation des adultes, réalité moderne, 1957
Le contact dans l'apostolat, 1959
Esprits durs, coeurs doux; la vie intellectuelle des militants chrétiens, 1959
Les comités : esprit et méthodes, 1962
Un type nouveau de laïc, 1966
Le Devoir et la crise d'octobre 70, 1971
Le Québec qui se fait, 1971
Une société stable, 1978
Regards sur le fédéralisme, 1995
Mon testament spirituel, 2004

Biographies
Aurélien Leclerc, Claude Ryan, l'homme du devoir, Les éditions Quinze, Montréal, 1978, 224 pages, 
Pierre Pagé, Claude Ryan, Un éditorialiste dans le débat social, Éditions Fides, Montréal, 2012, 544 pages,

See also
List of Quebec leaders of the Opposition

References

External links

1925 births
2004 deaths
Canadian newspaper editors
Canadian male journalists
Deaths from cancer in Quebec
Companions of the Order of Canada
Deaths from stomach cancer
Grand Officers of the National Order of Quebec
Journalists from Montreal
Politicians from Montreal
Quebec Liberal Party MNAs
Quebec people of Irish descent
Quebec political party leaders
Université de Montréal alumni
Le Devoir people